Grenaa (or Grenå) is a Danish town and seaport on the east coast of the Jutlandic peninsula. Tourism, education and commerce are important sectors in the economy of Grenaa. It is the only larger town on Djursland. Grenaa is the municipal seat, and the largest town, in Norddjurs Municipality, which covers the northern half of Djursland.

History 

Grenaa was first mentioned in 1231. It was granted the status of a market town in 1445.

Economy 
Grenaa has a lingering production industry just as in most of the western world. Development of tourism and educational institutions is sought to play a larger role for Grenaa in the future. The 5 km sandy Grenaa Beach is significant  for tourism, with a hinterland of summer cottages, including many rentals. Grenaa is a regional shopping centre for central-eastern Djursland, an about 40 km x 40 km peninsula, protruding into the sea, between Denmark and Sweden at the entrance to the Baltic Sea.

Tourism  

With 14.601 (2014) inhabitants Grenaa is also the largest town on the c. 40 km x 40 km peninsula, Djursland, where coastal tourism is important. Djursland has 22 sandy beaches along the three-sided 260 km coastline, with in the order of 7.000 summer-, and out of season-, rentals, primarily close to the coast and beaches. Grenaa Beach can be seen as the best of the beaches on Djursland, as it was elected as one of the two best beaches in Denmark in 2006. All coastlines in Denmark are accessible to the public by law, contributing to making the walkable and unspoilt coastlines of Djursland an asset for Grenaa's tourism.

Climate

The climate is coastal temperate, influenced by the Gulf Stream. Westerly and south-westerly winds are common.

Demographics
The geographical region, Djursland, where Grenaa is situated on the east coast, has an average population density of 42 inhabitants per square km, as compared to 407 for neighboring England and 230 for Germany. This, combined with the long coastlines, means that it seldom gets crowded on the coast and beaches. Something that also applies to the geologically varied often roling-hill country-side and farmland of Djursland, of which a bit more than 10% is forest.

Transport

Grenaa has a commercial seaport that has been expanded in recent years. The town is connected by ferry to Halmstad in Sweden and the Danish island of Anholt.

The town is also connected by railway to Denmark's second largest city, Aarhus, 60 km to the south-east, and is served by Grenaa railway station, terminus of the Aarhus-Grenaa railway line. The station offers direct local train services to Aarhus and Odder as part of the Aarhus Light Rail system. The southern part of the town is also served by the railway halt Hessel.

The nearest airport with scheduled national and international flights is Aarhus Airport which lies 20 km to the south-west from Grenaa.

Points of interest

 Grenaa Beach - 5 km of sandy beach starting at Grenaa Marina. Nominated as one of 2 best Danish beaches in 2006 
  Walks and hiking – North and south along the coastline from Grenaa, and along the other varied and accessible 260 km coastline of Djursland 
 Fishing and diving - from Grenaa Beach and east and south of Grenaa along the 50 km east coast of Djursland
 Cliffs of Sangstrup and Karlby - Fossil rich coastal lime cliffs 8 km north of Grenaa
 Kattegatcentret – Aquarium by the Sea in Grenaa with large sharks and a focus on Nordic salt water fish. 250 species of marine creatures from around the world, including seals.
 Grenaa Marina - marine environment with cafes, etc.
 Djurslands Museum & Danish Fisheries Museum in Grenaa  
 Baunhøj Mill, View overlooking Grenaa and countryside
 Mushroom picking in the forests and non-farmed areas of Djursland from August, through autumn until first frost. Such as in, Plantagen, a wood starting at the southern end of Grenaa
 Dansk Motor- og Maskinsamling / The Machine Collection with the largest collection of historical stationary engines in Northern Europe going back to 1860. Restored and functioning. 2 km from Grenaa 
 Sea trout and other fresh water fishing in Gren å, running through Grenaa, and in the adjoining, Sound of Kolind, canal system
 Salt water fishing from the coasts north and south of Grenaa. Such as for sea trout, mackerel  place and garfish
 Randers Regnskov – Zoo - Rain forest zoo by the river, Gudenaa, in transparent domes representing different continents. 60 km from Grenaa
 Aarhus - Denmark's second largest town, with several international attractions, such as, The Old Town, Den gamle By, 60 km from Grenaa  
 Fjord og Kystcentret – visiting centre related to Randers Fjord in Voer 45 km from Grenaa – focus on activities with regards to fish, fishing and shore biology, exhibits, boat rentals, and guided tours. Mini car ferry across Randers Fjord
 Herring fishing at Voer in Randers Fjord – seasonal - 45 km from Grenaa
 Kalø Castle - ruined castle on a peninsula with bights, inlets on southern Djursland 35 km from Grenaa 
 Mols Bjerge National Park – Hilly ice age like steppe landscape – walks, sightseeing drives, and  horseback riding, on southern Djursland 30 km south of Grenaa
 Djurslands medieval country churches. Thorsager church is the only round church in Jutland. Udby church by Randers Fjord is a picturesque navigation mark for incoming ships
Kalø Vintage Car Rally (Tirsdagstræf) – Popular gatherings for motor enthusiasts, every Tuesday afternoon and evening except in winter, close to Kalø Castle Ruin on southern Djursland, 32 km from Grenaa
 Djurs Sommerland - Amusement park.  The largest attraction on Djursland with regards to number of visitors. 22 km from Grenaa  
The Agricultural Museum, Landbrugsmuseet, Farmlife through the times.  Extensive historical vegetable gardens and fruit orchards at Gl. Estrup Castle, by the town, Auning, 35 km from Grenaa
The Manor Museum, Herregårdsmuseet, at Gl. Estrup Castle, by the town, Auning, 35 km from Grenaa 
 Katholm Castle, 6 km south of Grenaa
 Rosenholm Castle - by Hornslet, plus other castles and manor houses on Djursland
 Golf - Lübker Golf Resort by Nimtofte, also other golfing and golf-resorts such as by Grenaa-, Ebeltoft and Uggelbølle
Munkholm Zoo – Zoo for families with small children. Including friendly animals, and no long walks. 14 km from Grenaa
 Ree Safari Park – Zoo - In hills including savanna-like landscapes.  Also large animals. 22 km from Grenaa  
 Skandinavisk Dyrepark – Zoo - Park with extensive Nordic wildlife including brown- and polar bears. 22 km from Grenaa
 Glasmuseet, Ebeltoft. Modern international glass art and craftsmanship. Also local glass-craft workshops in the Ebeltoft-area. 31 km from Grenaa 
 , Ebeltoft – One of the world's largest wooden warships, restoration for 15 million euros completed in 1998. 31 km from Grenaa

Notable people 

 Hans Broge (1822–1908) a Danish merchant and politician
 Frits Hartvigson (1841–1919) a Danish pianist and teacher, spent many years in England
 Christian Zacho (1843–1913) a Danish landscape painter of Danish beech woods
 Ludvig Kabell (1853 in Vejlby - 1902) a Danish landscape painter
 Hans Peter Mareus Neilsen Gammel (1854-1931) emigrated to Texas c.1880, an author on the laws of Texas and a bookseller
 Julie Laurberg (1856–1925) an early Danish photographer, also active in women's rights
 Peder Mørk Mønsted (1859 in Balle Mølle – 1941) a Danish realist painter of landscapes
 Achton Friis (1871 in Trustrup – 1939) a Danish illustrator, painter, writer and explorer
 August Krogh (1874–1949) a Danish professor at the dept. of animal physiology at the University of Copenhagen;  awarded the Nobel Prize in Physiology or Medicine in 1920
 Olivia Holm-Møller (1875 in Homå – 1970) a Danish sculptor and painter of richly coloured, almost abstract paintings
 Gerda Wegener (1886 in Hammelev – 1940) a Danish illustrator and painter of art nouveau and later art deco images of fashionable women
 Søren Krarup (born 1937) a Danish pastor, writer, politician, member of the Folketing 2001-11
 Rebekka Mathew (born 1986) former child star, half of the Faroese pop duo Creamy

Sport 
 Peter Koefoed (1902 – 1983 in Grenaa) a Danish field hockey player, competed in the 1928 Summer Olympics
 Caspar Schrøder (1905 in Auning – 1989) a Danish fencer, competed at the 1936 Summer Olympics
 Hans-Henrik Ørsted (born 1954) a Danish former professional track cyclist, team bronze medallist at the 1980 Summer Olympics
 Steffen Rasmussen (born 1982 in Stenvad) a football goalkeeper with 404 caps with AGF Aarhus

Localities

 Djursland
 Mols
 Mols Bjerge National Park
 Ebeltoft
 Glatved Beach
 Danish steam frigate Jylland
 Katholm Castle
 Kalø Castle  
 Grenaa Beach
 Bønnerup Strand
Cliffs of Sangstrup
Lake Stubbe

See also

 Aarhus (Århus), Ebeltoft and Randers - nearby cities
 Grenå RK
 Grenaa Gymnasium & HF - secondary school

References

External links

 Official municipality website

 
Municipal seats of the Central Denmark Region
Municipal seats of Denmark
Cities and towns in the Central Denmark Region
Port cities and towns in Denmark
Norddjurs Municipality
Tourist attractions in Denmark
Tourist attractions in the Central Denmark Region
Beaches of Denmark